Willard was an American rock band from Seattle, Washington, formed around 1989. Though they sought to challenge the grunge image of Seattle, they are acknowledged as a part of the grunge music scene of the late 1980s and early 1990s.

History 
Jeff Gilbert and Tad Doyle were instrumental in Willard's record deal, which resulted in the Endino-produced Steel Mill in 1992. Gilbert called Willard the "drunkest band in Seattle" in his Rocket article. They had previously released a self-titled four song EP on Jerry O'Neill's a.k.a. Gerald Weymeth's Green Gel Records. After performing an outdoor show for the "Pain in the Grass" Festival at the Seattle Center, Willard was banned from further performances by the Seattle Police Department and the City of Seattle, resulting in band shirts displaying "Banned by the SPD". The music of Willard was sonically similar to another grunge band, Melvins. Otis was an early member of Napalm Beach, Clint and Peters played in H-Hour, while Wied was the original drummer for Tad.

They disbanded after recording eleven songs in November 1993. These songs were transferred from 2" tape to digital by Stuart Hallerman at Avast! Mark Spiders and Aaron Skok mixed the songs, and Black Guitar Records published the album, Underground, in 2018.

Band members 
 Johnny Clint – vocals
 Mark Spiders – guitars
 Otis P. Otis – guitars
 Steve Wied – drums
 Darren Peters – bass (1989–1993)
 Tyson Garcia – bass (1994–1997)

Discography 
Full releases
Sunshine Spread the Love EP (1989)
 Willard – EP (Green Gel Records, 1991)
Steel Mill (Roadrunner Records, 1992)
 Underground (Black Guitar Records, 2018)

Appearances
Roadrunner Records Promo PR063 features "Sweet Kali" (Roadrunner Records, 1992)
 Metal Detector CD Metal Monsters features "Stain" (FMBQ, 1992)
Best of Grunge Rock features "Fifteen" (Priority Records, 1993)
 Seattle Music Scene Volume 2 features demo version of "Larie" from ABV Sessions (Insight Records, 1994)

References 

American grunge groups
Musical groups from Seattle
Musical groups established in 1989
Musical groups disestablished in 1992